These are the results of the women's uneven bars competition, one of six events for female competitors in artistic gymnastics at the 1976 Summer Olympics in Montreal.  The qualification and final rounds took place on July 18, 19, and 22nd at the Montreal Forum.
It is particularly remembered for the first ever Perfect 10 in Gymnastics at the Olympic Games. Nadia Comăneci of Romania, who was only 14 at the time managed a perfect score, in the compulsory team round. The scoreboard had been designed with only three digits due to the apparent impossibility of a perfect score, so at the time, it only read, "1.00". Nadia would later follow her first perfect score with two others in the optional round and the final, to finish on a perfect score of 20.

Results

Qualification

Eighty-six gymnasts competed in the compulsory and optional rounds on July 18 and 19.  The six highest scoring gymnasts advanced to the final on July 22.  Each country was limited to two competitors in the final.  Half of the points earned by each gymnast during both the compulsory and optional rounds carried over to the final.  This constitutes the "prelim" score.

Final

References
Official Olympic Report
www.gymnasticsresults.com
www.gymn-forum.net

Women's uneven bars
1976 in women's gymnastics
Women's events at the 1976 Summer Olympics